Gordon Jones  (born 1886) was a Welsh international footballer. He was part of the Wales national football team, playing 2 matches. He played his first match on 23 February 1907 against Ireland and his last match on 4 March 1907 against Scotland.

See also
 List of Wales international footballers (alphabetical)

References

1886 births
Welsh footballers
Wales international footballers
Place of birth missing
Date of death missing
Association footballers not categorized by position